Legislative elections were held in South West Africa on 31 October 1934. The whites-only election saw a victory for the United National South West Party, which won eight of the twelve elected seats in the Legislative Assembly.

Electoral system
The Legislative Assembly had 18 seats, of which twelve were elected in single-member constituencies, and six were appointed by the territory's Administrator, David Gideon Conradie. The twelve constituencies were Gibeon, Gobabis, Grootfontein, Keetmanshoop, Kolmanskop, Luderitz, Okahandja, Otjiwarongo, Swakopmund, Warmbad, Windhoek Central and Windhoek District.

Results
Three seats, Gibeon, Kootmanshoop and Kolmanskop, were won unopposed by the United National South West Party. Of the six members appointed by Administrator, two were from the German League and four from the United National South West Party.

The results exclude the figures for Swakopmund, where an Independent candidate was elected with a 32-vote majority over their Economic League opponent.

References

South West Africa
1934 in South West Africa
Elections in Namibia
Election and referendum articles with incomplete results